Michael Sprinkle, (born in 1968 in San Francisco, California), is an American politician and served as a Democratic member of the Nevada Assembly beginning on February 4, 2013 representing District 30. Michael Sprinkle resigned from the Nevada Assembly in April 2019.

Education
Sprinkle earned his BLA from Loyola Marymount University.

Politics

2006 campaign

Initially challenging Republican Assemblyman John Marvel for the District 32 seat, Sprinkle was unopposed for the August 15, 2006 Democratic Primary, but lost the November 7, 2006 General election.

2012 campaign

When Democratic Assemblyman Debbie Smith ran for Nevada Senate and left the House District 30 seat open, Sprinkle was unopposed for the three-way June 12, 2012 Democratic Primary and won the November 6, 2012 General election with 12,094 votes (57.01%) against Republican nominee Ken Lightfoot.

2014 campaign

2016 campaign

2018 campaign

Michael Sprinkle was unopposed in the 2018 general election and remained seated in the Nevada State Assembly. However, due to "growing sexual harassment claims" Michael Sprinkle resigned from the Nevada Assembly in April 2019.

Assistant Majority Leader Julia Ratti said in a statement, "We condemn sexual misconduct in the strongest terms.”

References

External links
Official page at the Nevada Legislature
Campaign site
 

Date of birth missing (living people)
1968 births
Living people
Loyola Marymount University alumni
Democratic Party members of the Nevada Assembly
Politicians from San Francisco
21st-century American politicians